The Real Estate Show was a squatted exhibition by New York artists' group Colab, on the subject of landlord speculation in real estate held on New Year's Day (January 1, 1980) in a vacant city-owned building at 123 Delancey Street in the Lower East Side of Manhattan, New York City.

Exhibition
The squatting action followed a year of campaigning to rent the property for an exhibition space from officials of the NYC Department of Housing Preservation and Development (HPD).

On New Year's Day, the show was officially opened to the public. It was to be a two-week occupation/exhibit but was quickly closed down by the police. This brief exhibition went on to inspire a much larger and longer lasting Colab exhibition called The Times Square Show.

Eviction
On the morning of January 2, the Colab artists discovered the storefront padlocked shut and their work locked inside. Phone calls revealed it to be the doing of HPD. The Real Estate Show had been open exactly one day.

On January 8, the artists, accompanied by art dealer Ronald Feldman and German conceptual artist Joseph Beuys, at the invitation of Art Corp. Inc. co-founder John DiLeva-Halpern, assembled at the site to protest its closing in the company of reporters from the New York Times, SoHo Weekly News, and the East Village Eye. There was a photograph taken of Beuys at the front door of The Real Estate Show standing with John DiLeva-Halpern, Ronald Feldman, Alan W. Moore and Joseph Nechvatal taken that day.

On January 11 city workers swept into 123 Delancey, cleared out the exhibited work and trucked it to an uptown warehouse. It was not until a few days later that artists were granted entry into the warehouse to take their artworks home.

ABC No Rio
On January 16, a deal was reached with the city that gave birth to ABC No Rio when the artists were given control of nearby 156 Rivington Street as a compromise.

The Real Estate Show Revisited
In early 2014, there were four concurrent art exhibitions in New York City around The Real Estate Show: at James Fuentes Gallery, ABC No Rio, the Lodge Gallery, and Cuchifritos Gallery/Essex Street Market.

In June 2017, Becky Howland & Matthias Mayer curated The Real Estate Show at Spor Klubu in Berlin, drawing from documentation of the original Real Estate Show (1980) from the Archive Collection of the extant project space ABC No Rio. Included in the show were Robert Cooney, Mitch Corber, Peter Fend, Coleen Fitzgibbon, Bobby G (aka Robert Goldman), Ilona Granet, Becky Howland, Christof Kohlhofer, Gregory Lehmann, Ann Messner, Peter Mönnig, Alan W. Moore, Joseph Nechvatal, Cara Perlman, Scott Pfaffman, Christy Rupp and Robin Winters. In conjunction with this show, another exhibition called The Real Estate Show Extended/Berlin: Group exhibition on the subject of Gentrification, Real Estate Speculation and Selling out the City was presented at Kunstpunkt Berlin. This show included many Berlin artists along with four original members of the Real Estate Show (1980): Becky Howland, Peter Mönnig, Alan Moore, and Joseph Nechvatal. Howland, Mönnig, Moore and Nechvatal also participated in a panel discussion on Real Estate and Art on June 3, 2017 that was moderated by Howard McCalebb of Dada Post, Berlin.

See also

Colab
Mudd Club
Just Another Asshole
No wave cinema
Post-punk
The Times Square Show

Footnotes

References
 Julie Ault, Alternative Art, New York, 1965-1985, University of Minnesota Press, 2002. 
 David Little, Colab Takes a Piece, History Takes It Back: Collectivity and New York Alternative Spaces, Art Journal Vol.66, No. 1, Spring 2007, College Art Association, New York, pp. 60–74 (Article )
 Carlo McCormick, The Downtown Book: The New York Art Scene, 1974–1984, Princeton University Press, 2006.
 Alan W. Moore, Artists' Collectives: Focus on New York, 1975-2000 in Collectivism After Modernism: The Art of Social Imagination after 1945, Blake Stimson & Gregory Sholette, (eds) University of Minnesota Press, Minneapolis, 2007, pp. 193–221.
 Alan W. Moore, Art Worker: Doing Time in the New York Art World, Journal of Aesthetics & Protest Press, 2022, pp. 58-60, 62, 65, 68-75
 Alan W. Moore and Marc Miller (eds), ABC No Rio Dinero: The Story of a Lower East Side Art Gallery, Collaborative Projects, NY, 1985.
 Max Schumann (ed.), A Book about Colab (and Related Activities) Printed Matter, Inc, 2016. pp. 100–119
 Francesco Spampinato, The Real Estate Show and The Times Square Show Revisited 
 The Real Estate Show 

Cultural history of New York City
Art exhibitions in the United States
1980 in New York City
1980 in art
American artist groups and collectives
Conceptual art
Postmodern art
Artists from New York City
Non-profit organizations based in New York City
No wave
Performance art in New York City
Squats in the United States
Evicted squats